Isham Jaafar is a Bruneian physician who currently serves as the current Minister of Health since 2017.

Education 
Isham graduated from University of Dundee with a Bachelor of Medicine, Bachelor of Surgery degree in 1995 and later completed his specialist training in Cardiothoracic Surgery at the Institut Jantung Negara (IJN), Malaysia. He then completed his fellowship in Cardiothoracic Surgery at the Royal Papworth Hospital, Cambridge. Moreover in 2014, he acquired fellowship recognition from the Royal College of Physicians of Edinburgh, American College of Cardiology and the ASEAN Cardiology Congress. Royal College of Surgeons of Edinburgh and European Society of Cardiology recognize Isham's fellowship in 2015.

Medical career 
In 2005, he became the Consultant Cardiothoracic Surgeon at the Cardiac Centre Gleneagles JPMC. Since November 2009, Isham was promoted to the position of a Chairman among Jerudong Park Medical Centre (JMPC)'s board of directors and the executive director of Pantai Jerudong Specialist Centre (PJSC). Under his leadership, both JPMC and PJSC's laboratory have been accredited respectively by the Joint Commission International (JCI) in 2014 and International Standardization Organization (ISO) in 2017. On December 1, 2017, Isham was appointed as the Minister of Health by replacing Zulkarnain Hanafi after being consented by Sultan Hassanal Bolkiah.

Personal life 
During his personal free time, he enjoys golf and racquet sports such as badminton, tennis, and table tennis.

Awards and honours

Honours 
 
  Order of Seri Paduka Mahkota Brunei Second Class (DPMB) – Dato Paduka (2011)
  Order of Setia Negara Brunei First Class (PSNB) – Dato Seri Setia (2018)

See also 
 Cabinet of Brunei
 Health in Brunei

References 

Living people

Year of birth missing (living people)
Government ministers of Brunei
Health ministers of Brunei
Alumni of the University of Dundee
Members of the Legislative Council of Brunei